The Curator's House is a historic building in the Christchurch Botanic Garden, in Christchurch, New Zealand. It was built for the Curator of the Botanic Gardens in 1920 and it is now home to a restaurant, called The Curator's House.

History 
On the same site as the present Curator's House, a single-storey timber building was constructed in 1872 for the Christchurch Domain Curator, John Armstrong. By 1919, the original wooden building was in poor condition and the current Curator's House was built in its place in 1920. The Architectural firm Collins and Harman were employed in 1919 to design a two storied brick house with a slate roof. It was finished in 1920 and the house was the residence for the curators of the Botanic Gardens up until 1984. In 2000 it was renovated into a restaurant.

Heritage registration 

The building was registered as a heritage building by the New Zealand Historic Places Trust on 26 November 1981 with registration number 1863 classified as Category II listing. The Christchurch City Council also lists the Curator's House as a Heritage Place for its "high historical and social significance for its association with the development and history of the Christchurch Botanic Gardens".

See also 
 List of historic places in Christchurch

References

External links 
 Official website

Heritage New Zealand Category 2 historic places in Canterbury, New Zealand
Houses completed in 1920
Buildings and structures in Christchurch
1920s architecture in New Zealand